Mahalath was, according to the Bible, the third wife of Esau, daughter of Ishmael and sister of Nebaioth. Esau took Mahalath from the house of Ishmael to be his wife, after seeing that Canaanite wives (as was the case of his first two wives, Basemath and Judith) displeased his father, Isaac.

Esau sought this union with a non-Canaanite, in an effort to reconcile his relationship with his parents, namely with his father Isaac whose blessing he sought. However, there is no record of his parents' approval for the union of Esau and Mahalath. She bore a son, Reuel, to Esau.

In , on the other hand, Esau's three wives are differently named; his family is mentioned as composed of two Canaanite wives, Adah, the daughter of Elon the Hittite, and Aholibamah, and a third: Bashemath, Ishmael's daughter. Some scholars equate the three wives mentioned in Genesis 26 and 28 with those mentioned in Genesis 36, in the following way:

 Basemath = Adah, the daughter of Elon the Hittite;
 Judith = Aholibamah, also a Canaanite;
 Mahalath = Bashemath, Esau's cousin and third wife, daughter of Ishmael

References

Book of Genesis people
Women in the Hebrew Bible